Mondale High School is a school in the Western Cape, South Africa. The school was founded in 1982.

The school's name is derived from the  names of two roads running adjacent to the school: Montague drive and Merrydale avenue.

Fees are R 2,717 (approx. $247) but collection is very poor as it serves a community where there are very high rates of crime and unemployment. Despite this, academic performance is very good with a 100% pass rate in the NSC examinations in 2015 . The school has also won the A-section athletics competition 23 times in the last 25 years. It has produced 13 provincial athletes and soccer players who have played in the Premier League and for the national team. It has also performed well in provincial quiz competitions, winning twice.

Academics
Mondale is renowned for its academic excellence. Despite the fact that it is situated in a poverty stricken area it still maintains a high matric pass rate. Here is Mondale High School pass rate for the past decade:

Other Academic Achievements

In 2015 the matric pass rate results were 99.2% (2 pupil failed English), thus being in second place in Mitchell's Plain after Spine Road High achieved 99.3%, the difference being 0.1%. Due to a remark of the English papers, the pupil who failed were said to have passed. This putting Mondale on top of the chart achieving 100%.

Sports
Not only is Mondale good at academics but also excels in sporting codes. The school has also won the A-section athletics competition 23 times in the last 25 years. It has produced 13 provincial athletes and soccer players who have played in the Premier League and for the national team.

2016 - Champions A-section (Southern Zone) W.P.S.S.S.U.

2015 - Champions A-section (Southern Zone) W.P.S.S.S.U.

2014 - Champions A-section (Southern Zone) W.P.S.S.S.U.

2013 - Champions A-section (Southern Zone) W.P.S.S.S.U.

2012 - Champions A-section (False Bay / Southern Zone) W.P.S.S.S.U.

2011 - Champions A-section (False Bay / Southern Zone) W.P.S.S.S.U.

2010 - Champions A-section (False Bay / Southern Zone) W.P.S.S.S.U.

2009 - 2nd Place A-section (False Bay / Southern Zone) W.P.S.S.S.U.

2008 - Champions A-section (False Bay / Southern Zone) W.P.S.S.S.U.

2007 - Champions A-section (False Bay / Southern Zone) W.P.S.S.S.U.

2006 - Champions A-section (False Bay / Southern Zone) W.P.S.S.S.U.

2005 - Champions A-section (False Bay Zone) W.P.S.S.S.U.

2004 - Champions A-section (False Bay Zone) W.P.S.S.S.U.

2003 - Champions A-section (False Bay Zone) W.P.S.S.S.U.

2002 - Champions A-section (False Bay Zone) W.P.S.S.S.U.

2001 - Champions A-section (False Bay Zone) W.P.S.S.S.U.

2000 - Champions A-section (False Bay Zone) W.P.S.S.S.U.

1999 - 2nd Place A-section (False Bay Zone ) W.P.S.S.S.U.

1998 - Winners A-section (False Bay Zone ) W.P.S.S.S.U.

1997 - Winners A-section (False Bay Zone ) W.P.S.S.S.U.

1996 - Winners A-section (False Bay Zone ) W.P.S.S.S.U.

1995 - The Stainer Shield Athletic Champions (Pinelands/Plumstead/Westerford/Mondale)

1994 - The Stainer Shield Athletic Champions (Pinelands/Plumstead/Westerford/Mondale)

1993 - The Stainer Shield Athletic Champions (Pinelands/Plumstead/Westerford/Mondale)

1992 - The Stainer Shield Athletic Champions (Pinelands/Plumstead/Westerford/Mondale)

1991 - Winners A-section - Champion of Champions Athletic Winners

1990 - Winners A-section - Champion of Champions Athletic Winners

1989 - Winners A-section - Champion of Champions Athletic Winners

1988 - Winners A-section - Champion of Champions Athletic Winners

1987 - Winners A-section - Champion of Champions Athletic Winners

Subjects

Senior Phase (Grade 8 and 9) 
These subjects are offered to both grades 8 and 9 with no selective subjects:

English (Home Language)
Afrikaans (First Additional Language) 
Mathematics 
Economics and Management Sciences (EMS)
Social Sciences (History and Geography)
Natural Sciences
Technology
Creative Arts (Drama and Visual Arts)
Life Orientation

Further Education and Training (FET)
The FET phase partially begins at the fourth term of grade 9. Pupils choose 7subjects (4 compulsory, 3 selective). The subjects chosen depend on the pupil's marks on the third term of the grade 9 academic year (e.g you need 60% in the third term in grade 9 natural sciences to do Physical Science in grade 10 and 50% in grade 9 Mathematics to do Pure Mathematics in grade 10). The classes are then ranked from A to G with the top 40 students being in grade 10 A class although they can choose other classes depending on the subjects they want to do. All subjects from 10 A-G are different, with grade 10 A-C getting more difficult subjects than the rest. The subjects are not chosen individually but chosen in packages. The pupil are to continue with the subjects till the final year/matric (grade 12) unless there are difficulties with a subject.

Compulsory Subjects
English Home Language 
Afrikaans First Additional Language 
Pure Mathematics or Mathematics Literacy (Depending on the marks)
Life Orientation

Selective Subjects
(only allowed to choose three)
Physical Sciences
Life Sciences
Accounting 
Geography
Business Studies
Computer Application Technology (CAT)
History
Economics

Grade 10 A- D are pure Mathematics classes. Grade 10 A-C are Physical Sciences and Life Sciences classes. The subjects for 2017 were as follows:

Grade 10A
English Home Language
Afrikaans First Additional Language 
Pure Mathematics
Life Orientation
Life Sciences 
Physical Sciences
Accounting

Grade 10B
English Home Language 
Afrikaans First Additional Language 
Pure Mathematics
Life Orientation
Life Science
Physical Sciences 
Geography

Grade 10C
English Home Language 
Afrikaans First Additional Language 
Pure Mathematics
Life Orientation
Life Science 
Physical Science
Business Studies

Grade 10D
English Home Language 
Afrikaans First Additional Language 
Pure Mathematics
Life Orientation
Business Studies
Accounting
Economics 

Grade 10E
English Home Language 
Afrikaans First Additional Language 
Pure Mathematics
Life Orientation
Life Sciences
Computer Application Technology
Geography

Grade 10F and G
English Home Language 
Afrikaans First Additional Language 
Pure Mathematics
Life Orientation
History
Geography
Business Studies

References

External links

1982 establishments in South Africa
Educational institutions established in 1982
Schools in Cape Town